The Little Falls Broadway Bridge is the only road bridge within the city limits of Little Falls, Minnesota.  The bridge was built in 1941 and is the 3rd bridge to occupy the current spot.  It is located less than one block north of the Little Falls Dam and connects the city's "east side" and "west side".  Arguably, the major flaw of the bridge is that it lands before the railroad tracks on the west side, therefore traffic is blocked whenever a train goes through.  Proposals for a bridge that would go over the tracks have been discussed.

References

See also
List of crossings of the Upper Mississippi River

Road bridges in Minnesota
Bridges over the Mississippi River
Bridges completed in 1941
Girder bridges in the United States
Buildings and structures in Morrison County, Minnesota